Evfrosyni Patsou (born 5 June 1974) is a Greek sprinter. She competed in the 4 × 100 metres relay at the 2000 Summer Olympics and the 2004 Summer Olympics.

References

1974 births
Living people
Athletes (track and field) at the 2000 Summer Olympics
Athletes (track and field) at the 2004 Summer Olympics
Greek female sprinters
Olympic athletes of Greece
Place of birth missing (living people)
Mediterranean Games bronze medalists for Greece
Mediterranean Games medalists in athletics
Athletes (track and field) at the 2001 Mediterranean Games